Benedito Custódio Ferreira (3 July 1930 – 12 December 2020), nicknamed Escurinho, was a Brazilian footballer who played as an attacking midfielder and left winger.

Career
Born in Nova Lima, Escurinho played for Villa Nova, Fluminense, Atlético Junior, Portuguesa (RJ) and Bonsucesso.

He made 490 appearances for Fluminense between 1954 and 1964, the fifth highest in the club's history. He also scored 110 goals. With the club he won the 1959 Carioca Championship and the 1957 and 1960 Rio-São Paulo Tournament.

He was nicknamed the "Black Arrow" due to his speed.

He earned 8 caps for the Brazilian national team between 1955 and 1956.

He died on 12 November 2020 at the age of 90 from multiple organ failure. He was also suffering from Alzheimer's disease in the years leading up to his death.

References

1930 births
2020 deaths
Brazilian footballers
Brazil international footballers
Villa Nova Atlético Clube players
Fluminense FC players
Atlético Junior footballers
Associação Atlética Portuguesa (RJ) players
Bonsucesso Futebol Clube players
Association football midfielders
Association football wingers
Brazilian expatriate footballers
Brazilian expatriates in Colombia
Expatriate footballers in Colombia
People with Alzheimer's disease
Deaths from multiple organ failure